Bellarena railway station serves the village of Bellarena and the broader Limavady area in County Londonderry, Northern Ireland. The current two-platform station was opened in 2016, replacing the original single-platform 1853 station located on the opposite side of the nearby level crossing.

Original station (1853-2016)

Bellarena station has served several railway companies since its first opening on 18 July 1853. The original station buildings were erected between 1873 and 1875 to designs by the architect John Lanyon.

It was closed for goods traffic from 4 January 1965, and to passengers from 18 October 1976, but was later re-opened on 28 June 1982.

The original station buildings are now in private ownership and were converted to living quarters in 2005, with the exterior boasting the station's name in a unique tile pattern. The stationmaster's house was renovated in the 1980s.

Current station (2016-present)

In late 2015, work started on a new station at Bellarena, replacing the original 1853 station with one on a new site located on the other side of the adjacent level crossing. The new station opened to traffic on Monday 21 March 2016. Unlike the old station, the new station has two platforms, with a new passing loop replacing the one originally at Castlerock railway station. The original station features are still in existence and can easily be seen from the new station.

Service
Mondays to Saturdays there is an hourly service towards /Derry Waterside or Belfast Great Victoria Street operated by Northern Ireland Railways.

On Sundays there are 6 trains in each direction.

References

Railway stations in County Londonderry
Railway stations opened in 1853
Railway stations served by NI Railways
Railway stations closed in 1976
Railway stations opened in 1982
Reopened railway stations in Northern Ireland
Railway stations opened by NI Railways
1853 establishments in Ireland
Railway stations in Northern Ireland opened in 1853
Railway stations in Northern Ireland opened in the 20th century